Elizabeth Weil is an American journalist and nonfiction writer. Weil wrote for the New York Times for nearly 20 years, during which she also wrote freelance for a number of other magazines. She has also written two nonfiction books and co-authored two nonfiction books. Her journalism has received many accolades, including a New York Press Club Award and a GLAAD Award. Her biography The Girl Who Smiled Beads has received such accolades as the Andrew Carnegie Medal of Excellence in Nonfiction. From March 2020 until December 2021, Weil wrote for ProPublica. She is now a features writer for New York Magazine. Weil teaches part-time at UC Berkeley Graduate School of Journalism.

Personal life 
Weil graduated from Yale University. She lived in New York for many years while she wrote for the New York Times. At present, she lives in San Francisco, California with her husband (Daniel Duane), with whom she shares two daughters. Their daughter Hannah Duane is also a writer who has been published in HuffPost and is a graduate of Ruth Asawa San Francisco School of the Arts.

Career

Magazines 
Weil worked at the New York Times for nearly 20 years and currently writes for ProPublica. She has also published work in Matter,The Atlantic,  Outside, The California Sunday Magazine, Wired, Medium, Men's Journal, Vogue, Mother Jones, Pacific Standard, The New Republic, and others.

She has received a number of accolades:

 New York Press Club Award in Feature Reporting (2016)
 Lowell Thomas Award in travel writing
 GLAAD Award for coverage of LGBT issues
 National Magazine Award finalist
 James Beard Award in food writing
 Dart Award for coverage of trauma (2016)
 Shorty Awards Journalism nominee

Weil's work has also been anthologized in Best American Sports Writing, Best American Food Writing, and America's Next Generation of Great Women Journalists.

Books

The Girl Who Smiled Beads 
The Girl Who Smiled Beads: A Story of War and What Comes After, written with Clemantine Wamariya, was published April 24, 2018 by Crown.

The book received the following accolades:
 Andrew Carnegie Medals for Excellence in Nonfiction Longlist (2019)
 Alex Award winner (2019)
 Goodreads Choice Award Nominee for Memoir & Autobiography (2018)
 New York Times Recommended Book (2018)
 Washington Post Notable Nonfiction Book of 2018
 Glamour Best Book of 2018
 Kirkus Reviews Best Biographies of 2018
 Real Simple Best Book of 2018
 New York Times Bestseller

No Cheating, No Dying 
No Cheating, No Dying: I Had a Good Marriage. Then I Tried To Make It Better. was published February 7, 2012 by Scribner.

They All Laughed at Christopher Columbus 
They All Laughed at Christopher Columbus: An Incurable Dreamer Builds the First Civilian Spaceship was initially published in 2002, then republished on October 6, 2010, by Randomhouse Publishing Group.

References 

American journalists
Living people
Yale University alumni
Year of birth missing (living people)